National Route 489 is a national highway of Japan. The highway connects Shunan, Yamaguchi and Yamaguchi, Yamaguchi.

References

489
Roads in Yamaguchi Prefecture